Health Sciences Association of Alberta (HSAA) is a trade union in Alberta, Canada which represents approximately 29,800 members.

Background

In 1971, eleven "paramedical technical and professional members" established the HSAA to have a stronger representation than that provided by the larger existing labour unions.

HSAA membership include employees in Alberta's public and private health-care sectors, such as "paramedics, lab technologists, psychologists, pharmacists, and respiratory therapists."

The United Conservative Party (UCP) government under Premier Jason Kenney and Alberta Health Services, notified Health Sciences Association of Alberta, United Nurses of Alberta, and the Alberta Union of Provincial Employees of the government's intentions to cut an "estimated 6,400 to 7,400 unionized public-sector jobs by 2023".

In February 2020, the consulting firm Ernst and Young, submitted their commissioned report to Premier Kenney, in which they recommended "contracting out surgeries, hospital food service, housekeeping, laundry, security, laboratory testing". The HSAA warned that "contracting out surgeries, hospital food service, housekeeping, laundry, security, laboratory testing and more will lead to bigger hits to government coffers down the road." The HSAA said that "privatizing lab services in Alberta could affect 850 full-time positions".

Bargaining rights and labour negotiations

The Public Sector Wage Arbitration Deferral Act (Bill 9) which became law on June 20, 2019,  suspended and delayed hearings related to wage arbitration for Alberta's 180,000 public service workers represented by unions in 24 collective agreements, which included the HSAA, until August, when Janice MacKinnon's "Report and Recommendations: Blue Ribbon Panel on Alberta's Finances" was submitted.

In February 2020, an independent public-sector wage arbitrator decided for the Provincial government and against the HSAA with a "zero per cent wage increase" to HSAA workers. In his February 6 statement, Alberta Finance Minister Travis Toews said that the UCP provincial government prioritizes "service delivery over salary increases for public sector workers".

Notes

See also
 United Nurses of Alberta
 Alberta Union of Provincial Employees
 Canadian Union of Public Employees
 Alberta Teachers' Association
 Alberta Federation of Labour
 Canadian Union of Public Employees

References

External links 

 

Medical and health organizations based in Alberta
Healthcare trade unions in Canada
Public sector trade unions
Trade unions in Alberta